Thaddeus F. Malanowski (November 30, 1922 – January 23, 2020) was an American Catholic priest who served as the Deputy Chief of Chaplains of the United States Army. He was the first Polish-American to be in this position.

A native of Stamford, Connecticut, Malanowski was an ordained Roman Catholic priest for the Diocese of Norwich and served at his home parish of Holy Name of Jesus in Stamford, CT following his retirement from active ministry. In 1973, he was given the title of Monsignor by Pope Paul VI. He was a close friend of Elvis Presley.

Career
Malanowski was commissioned an officer in the United States Army in 1949. From 1951 to 1954, he served with NATO as a member of the 43rd Infantry Division. Other assignments he was given include serving at Headquarters, United States Army Europe before he was named Deputy Chief of Chaplains with the rank of Brigadier General. He held this position until his retirement in 1978.

Awards he has received include the Legion of Merit, the Army Distinguished Service Medal, the Meritorious Service Medal and the Army Commendation Medal with two oak leaf clusters.

Malanowski also served on the Haitian Health Foundation Board of Directors from 1985 until his death in January 2020 at the age of 97.

References

1922 births
2020 deaths
People from Stamford, Connecticut
United States Army generals
Deputy Chiefs of Chaplains of the United States Army
American Roman Catholic priests
Recipients of the Legion of Merit
Recipients of the Distinguished Service Medal (US Army)
American people of Polish descent
Catholics from Connecticut